Events from the year 1805 in Sweden

Incumbents
 Monarch – Gustav IV Adolf

Events
 31 October - Franco-Swedish War
 Dagens stunder by Johan Gabriel Oxenstierna
 Johan Olof Wallin awarded the big price of the Swedish Academy.

Births
 22 February - Princess Amalia of Sweden (died 1853)
 13 December - Pierre Deland, actor (died 1862)

Deaths
 25 May - Anna Maria Rückerschöld, author  (born 1725)
 23 December - Pehr Osbeck, explorer and naturalist (born 1723)
 Anna Hammar-Rosén, newspaper editor (born 1735)

References

 
Years of the 19th century in Sweden
Sweden